Abd-Rabbo al-Barassi is the self-declared head of the government of Barqa, the eastern half of Libya. Promoting a federalist agenda, he was appointed on 3 November 2013 in a meeting at Ajdabiya. The central government of Libya, located in Tripoli, does not recognize his authority or Barqa's autonomy.

References

Libyan politicians
Living people
Year of birth missing (living people)